Jagodje is a settlement on the Adriatic coast in the Municipality of Izola in the Littoral region of Slovenia. It is an urbanized settlement directly southwest of the town of Izola and was created from dispersed farmsteads in the area known as Jagodje and the hamlets of Kane (Canne), Kanola (Cànola), Kažanova (Casanova), Kostrlag (Costerlago), Lavore (Lavoré), Liminjan (Limignano), Loret (Loreto), Montekalvo (Montecalvo), and Šalet (Saletto). The local church is dedicated to the Holy Mother of Loreto. An ancient Roman port and settlement known as Haliaetum stood in the area of Simon Bay next to Jagodje as early as the 2nd century BC.

References

External links 

Jagodje on Geopedia

Populated places in the Municipality of Izola
Slovenian Riviera